Ildikó Cserey (born 30 November 1962) is a Hungarian rower. She competed in the women's quadruple sculls event at the 1988 Summer Olympics.

References

1962 births
Living people
Hungarian female rowers
Olympic rowers of Hungary
Rowers at the 1988 Summer Olympics
Rowers from Budapest